Olearia brevipedunculata, commonly known as the dusty daisy-bush (although this name may also refer to O. phlogopappa), is a small shrub with whitish-grey foliage and white daisy-like flowers in summer. Mostly found in Victoria and scattered locations in New South Wales, Australia.

Description
The branchlets are  covered in grey-whitish thickly matted small star shaped hairs. The leaves grow alternately are sessile or with an obscure stalk. The upper leaf surface is greyish with dense sparsely scattered star-shaped hairs. The leaf underside is grey-whitish, occasionally yellowish and covered in densely matted star-shaped hairs obscuring the leaf veins. The leaf margin is entire or with an irregular scalloped edge. The inflorescence is a cluster of 12-22 daisy-like flowers  in diameter in a single spray at the apex of branchlets on a short stem. The flower centre is yellow. Flowering occurs from December to January.

Taxonomy and naming
Olearia brevipedunculata was first formally described by N.G. Walsh in 2004 and the description published in Muelleria. The specific epithet (brevipedunculata) is derived from the Latin 
words brevis meaning "short" and  pedunculus meaning "small, slender stalk".

Distribution and habitat
The dusty daisy-bush is found in alpine, heath and shrubland areas of the Bogong High Plains and higher locations from Mount Buffalo and near Mount Kent in Victoria. It is also found in scattered locations in New South Wales.

References

brevipedunculata
Asterales of Australia
Flora of New South Wales
Flora of Victoria (Australia)
Plants described in 2018
Taxa named by Neville Grant Walsh